Xu Yanlu (born 16 September 1991) is a female Chinese football (soccer) player who plays as a midfielder.

International goals

References

External links 
 
 Official page

Living people
Chinese women's footballers
Chinese expatriate footballers
China women's international footballers
2015 FIFA Women's World Cup players
Sportspeople from Nantong
Footballers from Jiangsu
Women's association football midfielders
Footballers at the 2014 Asian Games
1991 births
Asian Games competitors for China